A referendum on re-establishing the Empire was held in France on 21 and 22 November 1852. Voters were asked whether they approved of the re-establishment of the Empire in the person of Louis Napoléon Bonaparte and family. It was approved by 96.9% of voters with a 79.8% turnout.

Results

References

Referendums in France
1852 in France
1852 referendums
French Second Republic
Second French Empire
November 1852 events